Juventinus Albius Ovidius was the name of the author of thirty-five distichs titled Elegia de Philomela, containing a collection of those words which are supposed to express appropriately the sounds uttered by birds, quadrupeds, and other animals.  For example:

The age in which the author lived is quite unknown, but from the last couplet in the piece it would appear that he was a Christian. German philologist Gottfried Bernhardy attempted to prove from Spartianus that this and other trifles of a similar description were composed by the contemporaries of the emperor Geta, the son of Septimius Severus and the brother of Caracalla.

References

3rd-century Romans
3rd-century poets
Ancient Roman poets
Albii
Year of death unknown
Year of birth unknown
3rd-century Latin writers